Crazy Heart is a 2009 American drama film, written and directed by Scott Cooper, in his feature directorial debut. Based on the 1987 novel of the same name by Thomas Cobb, the film centers on a down-and-out country music singer-songwriter (Jeff Bridges) who tries to turn his life around after beginning a relationship with a young journalist (Maggie Gyllenhaal). Supporting roles are also played by Colin Farrell, Robert Duvall, and child actor Jack Nation. Bridges, Farrell, and Duvall also sing in the film.

The novel on which the film was based was inspired by country singer Hank Thompson. Filming took place during 2008 in New Mexico (Albuquerque, Española, Galisteo, Santa Fe), in Houston, and in Los Angeles. Original music for the film was composed by T Bone Burnett, Stephen Bruton, Ryan Bingham, and others.

The film cost $7 million for Country Music Television to make and was originally acquired by Paramount Vantage for a direct-to-video release; it was later purchased for theatrical distribution by Fox Searchlight Pictures. It opened in limited release in the U.S. on December 16, 2009.<ref>{{cite web | url=http://blogs.indiewire.com/thompsononhollywood/2009/11/04/oscar_watch_crazy_hearts_bridges_joins_actors_fray/ | title=Oscar Watch: 'Crazy Hearts Bridges Joins Actors Fray | publisher=Anne Thompson/Blogs.IndieWire.com | access-date=November 4, 2009}}</ref> From its meager budget it amassed domestic earnings of $39.5 million plus $7.9 international for a worldwide total of $47.4 million. The film ends with a dedication to Bruton, a musician who died in the same year the film was made.

The film was met with acclaim and was nominated for three Academy Awards at the 82nd Academy Awards winning two: Best Actor for Bridges and Best Original Song for "The Weary Kind" written by Ryan Bingham and T Bone Burnett.

Plot
Otis "Bad" Blake is a 57-year-old alcoholic singer-songwriter who was once a country music star. He now earns a modest living by performing in small-town bars across the southwestern United States. Having a history of failed marriages (four that he admits to, although a reference is made to a fifth he does not discuss), Blake is without a family. He has a son who is 28 and he has not heard from him in 24 years. Otis Blake performs mostly on the road staying in cheap motels, and travelling alone in his 1977 Chevrolet Suburban. The film opens with his arrival at a bowling alley for a show.

In Santa Fe he meets Jean Craddock, a young journalist after a story, divorced and with a four-year-old son, Buddy. She interviews Blake one evening after his gig, and then as they become close, Jean visits again ostensibly to gather more material, and the two enter into a relationship. Jean and her son become a catalyst for Blake to get his life back on track. In doing so, he lets himself be pushed into renewing a professional relationship with Tommy Sweet, a popular and successful country music star he once mentored, and plays as the opening act at one of his concerts, despite his initial balking and wounded pride at being the opening act to his former student. He asks Tommy to record an album with him, but Tommy says his record company insists on a couple more solo albums before a duet project can be recorded. He instead suggests that Blake concentrate on writing new songs that Tommy can record solo, telling him he writes better songs than anyone else.

Blake's drinking soon gets out of control and he ends up running off the road while driving drunk. In the hospital, the doctor informs him that although he only sustained a broken ankle from the crash, he is slowly killing himself, and must stop drinking and smoking and lose 25 pounds if he wants to live more than a few more years. Blake's relationship with Jean makes him start to rethink his life. While in Houston, he calls up his son to make amends, only to have his son tell him that his mother, Bad's ex-wife, has died. His relationship with Jean starts to look up, with her visiting him with her son Buddy. After a situation where Blake loses Buddy briefly at a shopping mall while drinking at a bar, Jean breaks up with him.

After the breakup, Blake resolves to quit drinking. After going through a treatment program at a rehab center, and with support from an Alcoholics Anonymous group and old friend Wayne, Blake finally manages to get sober. Having cleaned up his act, he tries to reunite with Jean, but, despite congratulating him on getting sober, she tells him that the best thing he can do for her and Buddy is to leave them alone. Later, Blake finishes writing a song that he thinks is his best ever, "The Weary Kind" and sells it to Tommy.

Sixteen months later, Tommy plays "The Weary Kind" to an appreciative audience while Blake watches backstage, as his manager presents him with another of the large royalty checks for the song. As Blake is leaving, Jean approaches him, saying she has come to the show as writer for a large music publication. As they catch up, Blake sees an engagement ring on Jean's finger and tells her that she deserves a good man. He offers her the money from the royalty check for Buddy to have on his 18th birthday, which Jean initially refuses but eventually accepts after Blake says the song would not exist without her, and states that "it isn't money". Jean asks if Blake would like to see Buddy again, but Blake declines, saying it might be too unsettling for the boy. The film ends with Jean asking Blake for another interview, after which they walk away happily, chatting with each other with the Santa Fe hilltops in the background.

Cast
Jeff Bridges as Otis "Bad" Blake
Maggie Gyllenhaal as Jean Craddock
Colin Farrell as Tommy Sweet
Robert Duvall as Wayne Kramer
Paul Herman as Jack Greene
Jack Nation as Buddy, Jean's son
Ryan Bingham as Tony of Tony and the Renegades, backup group at bowling alley
Rick Dial as Wesley Barnes, Jean's uncle, Santa Fe piano player
Tom Bower as Bill Wilson

Production

Development of original novelThe New York Times said the novel which was written by Thomas Cobb, "also functions as a shrewd and funny running critique of contemporary country music." Cobb based the character "Bad" Blake on country music entertainer Hank Thompson, Ramblin' Jack Elliott and Cobb's doctoral advisor in graduate school, Donald Barthelme; Cobb studied with Barthelme in a creative writing class in the University of Houston in the 1980s. When Cobb struggled between using an "upbeat" ending and a "downbeat" ending, Barthelme suggested that Cobb use the "downbeat" ending. The nickname "Bad" came from a sentence that popped into Cobb's mind, "Bad's got the sweats again." The name "Blake" came from W. Glenn Blake, a friend from graduate school who is now a senior editor at Boulevard magazine, and some people Cobb knew in Tucson, Arizona. The book, which was out of print since its original publication, went into print again when the film was released.

Pre-production
The process of creating a film adaptation took many years because the concept was optioned, but was never produced into an actual adaptation until director Scott Cooper produced the film. Cobb assumed that the film would use a more upbeat ending, because the Hollywood film industry often prefers "things that are generally positive". According to Cobb, he had nothing to do with the making of the film. The shooting of a sequence depicting the novel's ending – in which Bad falls off the wagon and dies of a heart attack – occurred; Cooper wanted to use it as the ending, but he did not get final authority to do so. A sequence of Bad Blake visiting his son in Los Angeles was also cut from the final film.

Bridges initially passed on the role when he was first offered it. He explained to Vanity Fair that although he liked the script, he realized that the songs would make or break it and at the time the film had no musical attachments. A year later he talked with T Bone Burnett, who was approached to work on the film's soundtrack; together they both agreed to work on the film, and Bridges joined the project.

Music

The album entitled Crazy Heart: Original Motion Picture Soundtrack was released in 2009 to accompany the film. The 23-track album contains many songs written by Burnett, Bruton, and Bingham, but also some by John Goodwin, Bob Neuwirth, Sam Hopkins, Gary Nicholson, Townes Van Zandt, Sam Philips, Greg Brown, Billy Joe Shaver, and Eddy Shaver.

The songs are performed by various artists including actors Bridges, Farrell, and Duvall, as well as singers Bingham (who sings the theme song "The Weary Kind" and plays Tony in the film), Buck Owens, The Louvin Brothers, Lightnin' Hopkins, Waylon Jennings, Townes Van Zandt, and Sam Philips.

At the 82nd Grammy Awards, the theme song "The Weary Kind" by Ryan Bingham won for Best Song Written For Motion Picture, Television Or Other Visual Media and the soundtrack also won for Best Compilation Soundtrack Album For Motion Picture, Television Or Other Visual Media.

Reception

Critical response
Review aggregator website Rotten Tomatoes reports that 90% of critics have given the film a positive review based on 212 reviews, with an average score of 7.40/10. The consensus reads, "Thanks to a captivating performance from Jeff Bridges, Crazy Heart transcends its overly familiar origins and finds new meaning in an old story." On Metacritic the film holds a score of 83 out of 100, indicating "universal acclaim".

Critics mainly praised the performance of Jeff Bridges as Bad Blake, with many claiming he elevated the film above its seemingly conventional story and languid pace.  Tom Long from Detroit News writes, "It's a bit too easy, a bit too familiar, and maybe even a bit too much fun. But the easy magic Bridges brings to the screen makes it all work." The Toronto Star's Linda Barnard attests that "some goodwill evaporates in the final reel, when a few false endings lead to a choice that's not the best one for Crazy Heart, but the generosity of Bridges' performance puts us in a forgiving mood."

Jeff Bridges' performance earned him the Academy Award for Best Actor, as well as Best Actor prizes from the Los Angeles Film Critics Association, Broadcast Film Critics Association, Golden Globe Awards, Screen Actors Guild and the Independent Spirit Awards.  Bridges also received nominations from the Chicago Film Critics Association, London Critics Circle, Online Film Critics Society and the Satellite Awards.  Gyllenhaal was nominated for an Academy Award for Best Supporting Actress for her performance. The song "The Weary Kind" earned Ryan Bingham and T Bone Burnett the 2009 Academy Award for Best Original Song and a Golden Globe.

Accolades

Home media
The film was released on April 20, 2010, on DVD and Blu-ray. The single-disc DVDs special features included six deleted scenes and the Blu-ray 2-disc set contains eight deleted scenes (including one in which Bad reunites with his son). The Blu-ray also has two alternative music cuts and a short documentary in which the stars discuss "What Brought Them to Crazy Heart''".

References

External links
 
 
 
 
 
 Crazy Heart script

2009 films
2009 directorial debut films
2009 drama films
2009 independent films
2000s English-language films
2000s musical drama films
American independent films
American musical drama films
Country music films
Dune Entertainment films
Films about alcoholism
Films based on American novels
Films directed by Scott Cooper
Films featuring a Best Actor Academy Award-winning performance
Films featuring a Best Drama Actor Golden Globe winning performance
Films scored by T Bone Burnett
Films set in Tucson, Arizona
Films set in Colorado
Films set in New Mexico
Films set in Texas
Films shot in New Mexico
Films that won the Best Original Song Academy Award
Fox Searchlight Pictures films
2000s American films